Birla Institute of Technology, Patna is an educational institute offering undergraduate and postgraduate courses located in Patna, Bihar, India. It is an off campus of Birla Institute of Technology, Mesra, Ranchi.

History
Birla Institute of Technology, Patna Campus was established in  2006, on the initiative of Govt. of Bihar. The institute came into existence by Public-Private Partnership (PPP) mode under flagship management of BIT Mesra. The Chief Minister of Bihar Nitish Kumar, laid the foundation stone of the institute in December 2005. The institute started academic programme from the session 2006–07.

Campus

The campus of the Institute at Patna is located between the Bihar Veterinary College and the Jai Prakash Narayan Airport, the campus is fully residential and comprises academic space, staff quarters, transit hostel, dispensary, playground, gymnasium, student activity centre, dancing room, yoga hall and an auditorium. Besides the college also has a local police station for security reasons.

The campus is entirely residential with accommodation facilities provided for all students in hostels on the campus. The college offers free transport bus facility to its students. The campus has three boys' hostel and one girls' hostel. It also has an ATM facility. The college is also equipped with a central library with an online e-library system for greater benefits of the students. 
There is a future plan for further advanced development of the college campus.

Academics

Academic programmes 
The following Undergraduate courses are conducted at BIT Patna:-

Bachelor of Engineering (B.E.) in Civil Engineering.  
 Bachelor of Engineering (B.E.) in Computer Science Engineering.
 Bachelor of Engineering (B.E.) in Electrical & Electronics Engineering.
 Bachelor of Engineering (B.E.) in Electronics & Communication Engineering.
 Bachelor of Engineering (B.E.) in Information Technology.
 Bachelor of Engineering (B.E.) in Mechanical Engineering.
 Bachelor of Engineering (B.E.) in Production Engineering.
 Bachelor of Architecture (BArch).
 Bachelor of Computer Application (B.C.A).
 Bachelor of Business Economics (B.B.E).
 Bachelor of Business Administration (B.B.A).

The following Postgraduate courses are conducted at BIT Patna:-

 Master of Technology (MTech) in Computer Science & Engineering.
 Master of Engineering (M.E.) in Electronics & Communication Engineering.

The following Post Doctorate (PhD) courses are conducted in BIT Patna:-

 Civil Engineering.
 Computer Science Engineering.
 Electronics & Communication Engineering.
 Electrical & Electronics Engineering.
 Production Engineering.
 Management.
 Applied Physics.
 Applied Chemistry.
 Applied Mathematics.

Admissions
The student admission in Engineering & Architecture courses are done strictly through JEE(Main). Counselling process is done by its parent institution BIT Mesra.

Student life

Technika 
Technika is the annual technical festival of BIT-P. Viola is an annual rock-show organized during Technika, where national and international rock bands like Strings and Underground Authority had performed. The college also organizes annual athletic-meet & sports fest named "Prakrida" along with inter-branch sport tournaments .

Achievements
Students from the college have gone to NASA, and have won Microsoft Imagine Cup in previous years. The institute promotes coding culture among the students and people have represented the college in ACM ICPC like events. Filmmaking is the most appreciated hobby of the students. In September 2017, Department of IT, Government of Bihar conducted a 24-hour National Level Hackathon in the BIT Patna campus.

References

External links

 Official website

P
Engineering colleges in Patna
Universities and colleges in Patna
All India Council for Technical Education
Educational institutions established in 2006
2006 establishments in Bihar